Baron App Inc., doing business as Cameo, is an American video-sharing website headquartered in Chicago. Created in 2016 by Steven Galanis, Martin Blencowe, and Devon Spinnler Townsend, the site allows celebrities to send personalized video messages to fans. , more than 30,000 celebrities have joined the platform.

Overview
Steven Galanis and Martin Blencowe had the idea to create Cameo after leaving Galanis's grandmother's funeral. Blencowe's work included being a film producer and NFL agent. In April 2016, Blencowe got NFL player Cassius Marsh to record himself congratulating his friend on the birth of his son. The duo realized that "the selfie was the new autograph". Marsh tweeted a photo introducing his fans to the site and it was launched on March 15, 2017. Since then, celebrities with more than 20,000 Instagram followers are eligible to set up an account with Cameo.

Cameo has been named #19 of America's Best Startup Employers by Forbes and #17 by LinkedIn.

The site grew during the COVID-19 pandemic as it accommodates social distance restrictions. In July 2020 the site launched Promotional Cameos, a premium priced service for businesses to buy celebrity endorsements.

Reception 
Chicago Magazine called Cameo "The Most American Startup Ever". In 2020, Cameo topped Fast Companys list of the "World's Most Innovative Social Media Companies" and was listed as one of the "World's 50 Most Innovative Companies". In 2019, Cameo received the Momentum Award given annually by 1871 and the Chicagoland Entrepreneurial Center. Cameo was named one of the "50 Most Genius Companies" by Time magazine in 2018. Galanis was named one of "Hollywood's Top Innovators" by The Hollywood Reporter. Co-founder Townsend was included in a "Forbes 30 Under 30" list.

See also 

 Patreon
 OnlyFans
 Convoz

References

External links
 

American entertainment websites
Celebrity
Video hosting
Internet properties established in 2017